Traugott Märki was a Swiss footballer who played for FC Basel as goalkeeper.

Between the years 1928 and 1931 Märki played a total of four games for FC Basel. One of these four games was in the Swiss Serie A and the other three were friendly games. He played his domestic league debut for the club in the home game on 7 September 1930 as Basel won 2–1 against FC Bern.

References

Sources
 Rotblau: Jahrbuch Saison 2017/2018. Publisher: FC Basel Marketing AG. 
 Die ersten 125 Jahre. Publisher: Josef Zindel im Friedrich Reinhardt Verlag, Basel. 
 Verein "Basler Fussballarchiv" Homepage

FC Basel players
Swiss men's footballers
Association football goalkeepers